Change is the second and final studio album by American country music band Sons of the Desert. It was released in 2000 on MCA Nashville, and contains the singles "Change", "Everybody's Gotta Grow up Sometime" and "What I Did Right". "Albuquerque" was originally recorded by the band in the late 1990s for an unreleased second album for Epic Records, their former label.

Production
The album was mostly produced by Johnny Slate.

Critical reception
Country Standard Time wrote that the album "borders far more towards a generic, pop-sounding brand of country." Exclaim! thought that "the harmonies are their stock in trade and each track is expertly produced - riding that fine line between overly slick and heartfelt."

Track listing

Personnel

Sons of the Desert
Scott Saunders – piano, Hammond B-3 organ, synthesizer
Doug Virden – bass guitar, electric autoharp, background vocals
Drew Womack – lead vocals, acoustic guitar, electric guitar, kazoo
Tim Womack – background vocals, acoustic guitar, electric guitar

Additional musicians
Steve Brewster – drums, percussion
Paul Franklin – steel guitar
John Willis – electric guitar, acoustic guitar, banjo on "Goodbye to Hello"
Keith Urban – banjo on "Ride"
David Campbell – string arranger

Chart performance

References

2000 albums
MCA Records albums
Sons of the Desert (band) albums
Albums produced by Mark Wright (record producer)